Marcelo Alves Santos (born 7 February 1998), known as Marcelo Alves, is a Brazilian professional footballer who plays as a central defender for Portuguese club Tondela, on loan from Madureira.

Club career
Marcelo Alves was born in Rio de Janeiro, and finished his formation with Madureira. He made his first team debut on 13 July 2017, starting in a 1–2 away loss against São Gonçalo, for the year's Copa Rio.

Marcelo Alves was definitely promoted to the main squad in November 2018, after an unassuming loan spell at Barra da Tijuca. After being sparingly used, he moved to Rio Branco-ES also in a temporary deal.

On 30 July 2020, still owned by Madureira, Marcelo Alves was announced at Série A side Vasco da Gama. He made his debut in the category on 2 September, starting in a 2–2 away draw against Santos.

Career statistics

References

External links
Vasco da Gama profile 

1998 births
Footballers from Rio de Janeiro (city)
Living people
Brazilian footballers
Association football defenders
Madureira Esporte Clube players
Rio Branco Atlético Clube players
CR Vasco da Gama players
Esporte Clube Vitória players
C.D. Tondela players
Campeonato Brasileiro Série A players
Campeonato Brasileiro Série B players
Primeira Liga players
Liga Portugal 2 players
Brazilian expatriate footballers
Expatriate footballers in Portugal
Brazilian expatriate sportspeople in Portugal